Glenfield was a large industrial manufacturing company based in Kilmarnock, Ayrshire, Scotland. At its height it was reckoned to be the largest company of its type in the Commonwealth.

Company history

The major growth period was between 1871 and 1904, under the direction of Thomas Kennedy (nephew of Thomas Kennedy, senior). ‘The Glen' became an important hydraulic engineering concern in Britain , with substantial export orders to most parts of the world.

 1863 - Kennedy Patent Water Meter Co Ltd was formed.
 1865 - the Glenfield Co Ltd was formed to supply castings and undertake general foundry work. The two companies shared a site.
 1899 - the two companies merged to form Glenfield & Kennedy Ltd.
 1921 - British Pitometer Co Ltd formed as a subsidiary
 1940s - acquired  Alley & MacLellan Ltd, founded in 1875 in Bridgeton, Glasgow, Scotland, manufactured valves and later compressors, vacuum pumps and steam engines.
 1954 - Private company.
 1982 - Low Glencairn Street site demolished. Manufacture continues at new site off Queens Drive
 1985 - Acquired by Biwater
 1996 - Sale of the valves operation by Biwater.
 1998 - Sale of penstocks and pumps business by Biwater
 2001 - Glenfield Valves became a member of AVK Holding A/S.

Major projects
Glenfield and Kennedy were involved in a number of major projects through the years, some of which are listed below:

 1938 - 1986. Supply of floodgates to the London Underground.
 1942 -supply of valves for PLUTO, the PipeLine Under The Ocean associated with World War II's Operation Overlord.

References

External links
 Official website

British companies established in 1899 
Manufacturing companies established in 1899 
1899 establishments in Scotland
British companies disestablished in 2001
2001 disestablishments in Scotland